Barney Nightingale (born 5 November 1996) is an English born, Welsh rugby union player who plays for Bargoed RFC as a centre. He formerly played for the Dragons regional team and the Wales under-20 rugby team.

Nightingale made his debut for the Dragons regional team in 2015 having previously played for the Dragons academy, racking up a total of five appearances in the 2014-15 season. Later that year he was part of the Wales under-20 squad for the 2015 world championships, where he made four appearances. Opportunities at the Dragons were scarce in subsequent seasons and Nightingale was released at the end of the 2017-18 season to join Bargoed RFC.

References

External links 
Guinness PRO12 profile
Dragons profile

1996 births
Living people
Rugby union players from Bristol
Dragons RFC players
Welsh rugby union players
Rugby union centres